On 17 December 1960, a Convair C-131D Samaritan operated by the United States Air Force on a flight from Munich to RAF Northolt crashed shortly after take-off from Munich-Riem Airport, due to fuel contamination. All 20 passengers and crew on board as well as 32 people on the ground were killed.

Accident

On 17 December 1960, the Samaritan was due to fly from Munich-Riem airport in Germany to RAF Northolt in the United Kingdom with 13 passengers and 7 crew. Shortly after takeoff, the aircraft lost power to one of its two Pratt & Whitney R-2800 radial engines. Unable to maintain altitude and with bad visibility due to fog, it hit the  steeple of St. Paul's Church next to the Oktoberfest site (then vacant) in the Ludwigsvorstadt borough. Subsequently, at 2:10 PM, it crashed into a crowded two-section Munich tramway car on Martin-Greif-Straße, close to Bayerstraße.

All 13 passengers and 7 crew members on the plane died. 32 people on the ground were killed and 20 were injured. A section of the wing crashed through the roof of a building at Hermann-Lingg-Straße, a block away from the main accident site, without injuring anybody there. The Free Lance-Star, a daily newspaper for Fredricksburg and its surrounding areas, reported that some passengers on the Convair were holiday-bound University of Maryland students who were dependants of military personnel stationed in England.

Aircraft
The accident aircraft, Convair C-131D-CO Samaritan, (c/n 212, company designation: Model 340-79), was a twin piston engined military transport with seating for 44 passengers. Given the military serial number 55-0291, the aircraft was the first United States Air Force C-131 to be based in Europe, at RAF Northolt, where it was under command of the 7500th Air Base Group, 3rd Air Force, U.S. Air Forces in Europe (USAFE).

Investigation
A crash investigation revealed water in the fuel tank booster pump. Because water is more dense than fuel it can settle to the bottom of the tank, into the pump inlets; when it freezes it blocks inlets and deprives the engine of fuel. This deprivation of fuel caused the Munich C-131 to lose power and eventually shut down the engine.

Aftermath
After the accident, the Munich Fire & Rescue Services ordered new TLF 16 powder trucks to complement their fleet of traditional water tenders.

Munich had initiated the expansion plans for Munich-Riem Airport in 1954. However, two plane crashes within the Munich city limit in the space of two years, and the New York air disaster that happened a day before, stopped the expansion plans. The city and state governments decided to build a new airport outside the city limit instead. Similar discussions were held in Hamburg about its Fuhlsbüttel Airport, but the airport was expanded rather than relocated elsewhere, making the airport the oldest continuously operated in Germany to this day.

See also

 1960 New York mid-air collision: two airliners collided on 16 December 1960
 American Airlines Flight 6780: first fatal crash of a Convair 240 on 22 January 1952
 British Airways Flight 38: suffered engine failure due to ice crystals in the fuel, clogging the fuel-oil heat exchanger just short of the runway at Heathrow Airport, London, UK on 17 January 2008
 List of accidents and incidents involving military aircraft
 Lynyrd Skynyrd 1977 CV-240 crash

 1955 Altensteig mid-air collision
 1959 Okinawa F-100 crash
 1964 Machida F-8 crash
 1977 Yokohama F-4 crash
1988 Remscheid A-10 crash
 Cavalese cable car disaster (1998)

References

Other sources
 Oberbayerisches Volksblatt / Rosenheimer Anzeiger (No. 293 – year 106), 19 December 1960 (German)
 Neue Deutsche Wochenschau 569/1960 Summary of a TV report (German). Retrieved 23 January 2019.
 Great Disasters by Editor John Canning,  published by Octopus in 1976.
 Erinnerungen an das Drama in München. Bavarian Broadcasting Corporation: text, video and pictures (German). Retrieved 23 January 2019.

Aviation accidents and incidents in Germany
History of Munich
Munich Convair 340 Crash, 1960
Aviation accidents and incidents in 1960
Accidents and incidents involving United States Air Force aircraft
1960s in Munich
Germany–United States relations
University System of Maryland
December 1960 events in Europe
Tram accidents
Accidents and incidents involving the Convair CV-240 family